Cardigan School may refer to:
 Cardigan Mountain School
 Cardigan County School
 Cardigan County Secondary School